Falling for Challenge is a web drama created by Samsung company. The drama stars South Korean actress Kim So-eun and Kim Min-seok. The web drama became the most watched web drama in 2015 with 21,124,965 views. "Falling for Challenge" is one of the most watched web drama ever with over 24 million views.

Plot
Na Do-jeon is a timid but bright boy who works part-time as a Pierrot because he genuinely loves making people laugh. Ban Ha-na is a girl dreaming of having her own food truck and developing a food truck app. The two incidentally run into each other and slowly form a relationship over subsequent meetings. This is the story of their single-handed fight to prevent the closure of the "One Plus One" hobby club where they fell in love.

Cast 
Kim Min-seok as Na Do-jeon
Kim So-eun as Ban Ha-na
Jang Hee-ryung as Ki Yeo-woon
Jang Yoo-sang as Nam Gong-dae
Park In-hwan as Landlord grandpa (Ep. 6)

Original soundtracks

Falling For Challenge OST Part 1

Falling For Challenge OST Part 2

Falling For Challenge OST Part 3

Falling For Challenge OST Part 4

Falling For Challenge OST Part 5

Chart performance

Awards and nominations

References

External links 
 Naver TV Cast
 Daum Movie

2015 web series debuts
2015 web series endings
South Korean drama web series
Naver TV original programming